Luise Charlotte Marie Reuter, also Louise R. (9 October 1817) as Luise Charlotte Marie Kuntze – 9 June 1894) was the wife of the poet and Low German writer Fritz Reuter.

Life 
Born in Grevesmühlen, Reuter was the second of eight children of the rector of the Grevesmühlen town school and later pastor in Roggenstorf, Wilhelm (Gottlieb Peter) Kuntze (1778–1863), and his wife Wilhelmine (Caroline Christine), née Scharff (1794–1859). The parents moved to Roggenstorf in 1818, where the father took over the pastorate and held it until 1858.

As the eldest daughter, Luise had to take on a variety of duties in the large household. In April 1844, she then took up a position as a child educator with Pastor Friedrich Johann Augustin (1794–1862) in Rittermannshagen.

The Rust family, where Fritz Reuter worked, and the Augustin family were friends, so that Reuter and Luise Kuntze soon met. In May 1847, the two became engaged. Luise supported the household by giving piano and French lessons. They then lived in Neubrandenburg from April 1856 to 1863, where her husband rose to become an acclaimed writer of national standing. Deep insights into Luise's world of thought are provided by numerous letters to her best friend, the landowner's wife Marie Peters (1822–1897), with whom she corresponded for decades from 1856.

When her husband died in 1874 at the age of 76, she had an imposing tomb built for him in Eisenach.

Reuter outlived her husband by twenty years. Her role as wife and executor of Fritz Reuter's estate has been controversially discussed in Reuter literature for many decades, especially with regard to his departure from Mecklenburg. Fritz Reuter had intended the following epitaph for his wife: "She has sown love in life, she shall reap love in death".

The brothers Heinrich (born 1816), Carl (born 1824) and Theodor (born 1828) emigrated to Australia in 1852. The brother Friedrich (born 1832) emigrated to South America in 1852. The brother Theodor Kuntze is shown to have been in the US in the 1890s.

Honours 
In 1927, the Lowise-Reuter-Ring in Berlin's Hufeisensiedlung was named in her honour. In 1997, the village community centre in Roggenstorf was named after Luise Reuter. A memorial stone south of the church in Grevesmühlen, erected around 1999 by the Grevesmühlen local history society, commemorates her.

Letters 
In Fritz Reuter Literary Archive Berlin:
 5 letters Luise Reuter to  3 January 1864 to 9 July 1867.
 9 letters Luise Reuter to various recipients (August Junkermann and others) 9 July 1867 to 19 October 1891
 4 letters written by Luise Reuter and signed by her as "Fritz Reuter" to various recipients 3 February 1871 to 30 December 1873
 Promissory notes issued by Dethloff Carl Hinstorff to Luise Reuter and countersigned by her for book fees received 27 September 1875 to 19 October 1891.
Further letters of Luise Reuter in:
 Badische Landesbibliothek
 Bayerische Staatsbibliothek
 
 .

References

Further reading 
 Karl Theodor Gaedertz: Luise Reuter. Ein Selbstporträt in Briefen. In Fritz Reuter-Kalender auf das Jahr 1908. Leipzig 1907, .
 Cornelia Nenz: Auf immer und ewig Dein Fritz Reuter. Aus dem Leben der Luise Reuter. Rostock 1998, .

External links 
 

19th-century German women
1817 births
1894 deaths
People from Grevesmühlen